Goldmark can refer to:

People
Henry C. Goldmark (1857–1941), American engineer who designed and installed the Panama Canal locks
Joseph Goldmark (1819–1881), Hungarian-American physician and chemist
Josephine Clara Goldmark (1877–1950), American social activist
Karl Goldmark (Goldmark Károly, 1830 –1915), Viennese composer
Kathi Kamen Goldmark (1948–2012), American author, columnist, publishing consultant, radio and music producer, songwriter and musician
Pauline Goldmark (1874–1962), American social reformer
Peter Carl Goldmark (1906–1977), Hungarian-American engineer and inventor
Peter Carl Goldmark, Jr. (born 1940), American publisher and journalist
Peter J. Goldmark (born 1946), American rancher, geneticist and politician
Rubin Goldmark (1872–1936), American composer, pianist, and educator

Other
German gold mark, coinage of the German Empire, 1871–1918
GOLDMARK, a mnemonic for causes of high anion gap metabolic acidosis